The decade of the 1090s in art involved some significant events.

Events

Works
 1093-1097: The illuminated manuscript Stavelot Bible completed

Births
 1096: Wang Ximeng - Chinese court painter of the Northern Song period (died 1119)
 1098: Yang Buzhi – Chinese master of ink paintings of plum blossoms in the Song Dynasty (died 1167)
 1098: Hildegard of Bingen - German writer, composer, philosopher, Christian mystic, Benedictine abbess, visionary, polymath, poet, and producer of miniature Illuminations (died 1179)

Deaths
 1090: Guo Xi – Chinese landscape painter who lived during the Northern Song dynasty (born 1020)

Art
Years of the 11th century in art